Showmen's Rest in Forest Park, Illinois, is a 750 plot section of Woodlawn Cemetery mostly for circus performers owned by the Showmen's League of America  The first performers and show workers that were buried there are in a mass grave from when between 56 and 61 employees of the Hagenbeck-Wallace Circus were interred. They were killed in the Hammond circus train wreck on June 22, 1918, at Hessville, Indiana, (about 5 miles east of Hammond, Indiana), when an empty Michigan Central Railroad troop train from Detroit, Michigan, to Chicago, Illinois, plowed into their circus train. The engineer of the troop train, Alonzo Sargent, had fallen asleep. Among the dead were Arthur Dierckx and Max Nietzborn of the "Great Dierckx Brothers" strong man act and Jennie Ward Todd of "The Flying Wards".

The Showmen's League of America, formed in 1913 with Buffalo Bill Cody as its first president, had recently selected and purchased the burial land in Woodlawn Cemetery at the intersection of Cermak Road and Des Plaines Avenue in Forest Park, Illinois, for its members. Services were held five days after the train wreck. The identity of many victims of the wreck was unknown. Most of the markers note "unidentified male" (or female). One is marked "Smiley," another "Baldy," and "4 Horse Driver."

The Showmen's Rest section of Woodlawn Cemetery is still used for burials of deceased showmen who are said to be performing now at the biggest of the Big Tops. A Memorial Day service is held at Woodlawn Cemetery every year.

Other Showmen's Rests include one at Mount Olivet Cemetery, Hugo, Oklahoma. Hugo is a winter circus home which calls itself Circus City, USA. In Miami, Florida, the largest Showmen's Rest is at Southern Memorial Park where large elephant and lion statues flank hundreds of markers commemorating circus greats and not-so-greats. Tampa, Florida's Showmen's Rest is located close to the Greater Tampa Showmen's Association near downtown.

Hagenbeck-Wallace Circus wreck

Following the wreck of June 22, 1918, the Hagenbeck-Wallace Circus had to cancel only two performances: the one in Hammond, Indiana and its next stop Monroe, Wisconsin. This was due in part by the assistance by many of its so-called competitors, including Ringling Brothers and Barnum and Bailey Circus lending needed equipment and performers so that the show could go on. The city of Hammond also joined in to help the surviving circus performers and workers. Many of the city's residents and shopkeepers gave food and clothing as well. Statues of five elephants surround the Showmen's Rest section of Woodlawn Cemetery in Forest Park, Illinois. The elephants each have a foot raised with a ball underneath, and the trunks lowered. (Raised trunks are a symbol of joy and excitement; lowered trunks symbolize mourning). The base of the large central elephant is inscribed with "Showmen's League of America." On the others are the words "Showmen's Rest." Some nearby residents say the sounds of ghostly elephants can be heard at night. While Brookfield Zoo is nearby, no elephants are in captivity there.

In popular culture 
Location used in an episode of NBC's Chicago Fire (Ep. Dead of Winter, 2021). A grave-keeper's arm is pinned under a fallen gravestone.

See also 
 List of United States cemeteries

References

External links
 Showmen's Rest webpage, Showmen's League of America
 Annual Clown Week Observance/Celebration/Ceremony at Showmen's Rest
 
 
 National Showmen's Association Cemetery, Hartsdale, New York
 Billboard article listing other Showmen's Rests

Circuses
Cemeteries in Cook County, Illinois
Forest Park, Illinois